Hrytsko Hryhorenko was the pen name for Oleksandra Sudovshchykova-Kosach (March 1867, Makariev, Kostroma Province – 27 April 1924, Mogilev or Kyiv), who was a Ukrainian journalist and writer.

Biography
The daughter of Yevhen Sudovshchykov, a Russian teacher, and Hanna Khoynatska, she was born in northern Russia where her parents had been exiled for their pro-Ukrainian activities. After the death of her father in 1868, she returned with her mother to Kiev. She was educated there and joined a literary group, the Pleiada, which studied Ukrainian literature and translated foreign authors into Ukrainian.

She wrote poetry in Ukrainian, Russian and French. She also translated Ukrainian writers into French and French, Swedish and English writers into Ukrainian. In 1893, she married Mykhaylo Kosach. He was forced to move to Estonia to continue his studies because of his political views, so Oleksandra and her mother moved to Tartu. There she began writing prose and published her first collection of stories Nashi lyudy na seli (The Lives of our Peasants] in 1898.

In 1901, they returned to Kharkiv, where her husband became a professor at the University of Kharkiv. Unfortunately, he died two years later. She moved to Kiev with her daughter. She completed a law degree and worked in a court. She also became involved in the women's movement.

Some of Hrytsko Hryhorenko's works were translated into English and comprise  collections From Heart to Heart (1998) and Warm the Children, O Sun (1998).

References 

1867 births
1924 deaths
Ukrainian women poets
Ukrainian women short story writers
Ukrainian short story writers
Ukrainian feminists
Ukrainian women journalists
Pseudonymous women writers
Ukrainian translators
19th-century Ukrainian women writers
20th-century Ukrainian women writers
19th-century Ukrainian writers
20th-century Ukrainian writers
19th-century translators
19th-century pseudonymous writers
20th-century pseudonymous writers